George and Lachlan Rattray (circa 1704) were accused of witchcraft in Inverness. They were apprehended in 1704, allegedly guilty of "the horrid crimes of mischievous charms, by witchcraft and malefice, sorcery or necromany". They were tried locally under a commission from the Lords of the Privy Council, and sentenced to execution in 1706.

References 

18th-century Scottish people
Witchcraft in Scotland